Hari Kumar Rimal (born 13 June 1987) is a Nepalese long-distance runner. He competed at the 2016 Summer Olympics in Rio de Janeiro, in the men's 5000 metres.

References

External links

1987 births
Living people
Nepalese male long-distance runners
Olympic athletes of Nepal
Athletes (track and field) at the 2016 Summer Olympics
Athletes (track and field) at the 2010 Asian Games
Athletes (track and field) at the 2014 Asian Games
Asian Games competitors for Nepal
Nepalese male cross country runners
21st-century Nepalese women